Carole Sinoquet (born June 7, 1975 at Domont) is a former French athlete, who specialized in the hammer throw.

Biography  
She won two titles of champion of France in the hammer throw in 1995 and 1996.

In 1996, she improved on four occasions French hammer throw record successively bringing it to 57.06 m,  57.16 m,  57.32 m and 57.54 m.

Prize list  
 French Championships in Athletics   :  
 2-time winner in the hammer throw 1995 and 1996.

Records

Notes and references  
 Docathlé2003, Fédération française d'athlétisme, 2003, p. 432

1975 births
Living people
French female hammer throwers
20th-century French women